Xu language may refer to:

!Kung language 
Kxoe language

See also
 Xû language (disambiguation)